Wenatchee School District #246 is a public school district of the State of Washington serving the city of Wenatchee and surrounding communities. As of May 2016 the approximate student population of the district is 7,931, served by 467 teachers.

Schools

Demographics
Due to the location of Wenatchee, the city hosts a large minority population. Approximately 30% of students are Hispanic, 1.3% are Asian, .5% are African American, and the remaining are either Caucasian or Native American. The large percentage of Hispanic students comes from the number of Hispanics that migrate to and from Wenatchee and surrounding communities to work in the local fruit industry.

See also
Wenatchee, Washington
Sunnyslope, Washington
Malaga, Washington

References

External links
Wenatchee Public Schools

School districts in Washington (state)
Education in Chelan County, Washington